Ryang Kyu-sa (born 3 June 1978) is a retired Zainichi Korean footballer who played for North Korea in 2000 AFC Asian Cup qualification.

Ryang recently opined on the Japanese abducted to the North by being shocked and stating "there are some strange aspects of North Korea".

Club statistics

References

External links 

 

1978 births
Living people
Association football people from Okayama Prefecture
North Korean footballers
North Korea international footballers
North Korean expatriate footballers
J1 League players
K League 1 players
Tokyo Verdy players
Ulsan Hyundai FC players
Thespakusatsu Gunma players
Fagiano Okayama players
Expatriate footballers in Japan
Zainichi Korean people
Expatriate footballers in South Korea
Association football forwards